NGC 192 is a spiral galaxy in the constellation Cetus. It was discovered on December 28, 1790 by William Herschel.

References

External links
 

0192
0401
002352
Barred spiral galaxies
Cetus (constellation)
+00-02-104